Berkshire Fine Spinning Associates was an American textile company, founded in 1889 as Berkshire Cotton Manufacturing Company in Adams, Massachusetts in Berkshire County, Massachusetts.

History
The first mill built by the company was Berkshire Mill No. 1 in Adams. In June 1899, President William McKinley laid a cornerstone for the "new mills" of Berkshire Cotton Manufacturing, but was forced to cut his visit short by his wife's illness. By 1917, the company was capitalized at $2,500,000 and contained over 260,000 ring and mule spindles and 6,500 looms for the production of cotton textiles, making it one of the largest cotton textile companies in the world. In 1929, Berkshire merged with the Valley Falls Company of Rhode Island, and became known as Berkshire Fine Spinning Associates. Its head was Malcolm Greene Chace of the influential Chace family of New England. Malcolm's descendants (his son Malcolm Jr, and grandson Malcolm III) would be involved with the company until 2007.

In 1930, the company acquired the King Philip Mills in Fall River, Massachusetts. In 1931, the company acquired the Parker Mills of Fall River and Warren, Rhode Island.

Unlike many New England textile companies that failed during the 1920s and 1930s, Berkshire Fine Spinning Associates would survive the Great Depression intact. At its peak in 1948, Berkshire earned $29.5 million and employed 11,000 workers at 11 mills, under the leadership of Malcolm Greene Chace Jr.

In 1955, Malcolm Jr. put together the merger of Berkshire with Hathaway Manufacturing Co., founded in New Bedford, Massachusetts in 1888 by Horatio Hathaway, to form Berkshire Hathaway Inc.

By 1958, the complex was closed by Berkshire Hathaway, with Mill #4 having been the last cotton mill in the state's westernmost county. By the early 1960s, the mills had been sold separately. Declining demand for industrial spaces led to the demolition of Mills #2 and 3, leaving Mill #1 as it originally stood.

Also in the 1960s, outside Adams the Berkshire mill empire had declined to seven plants and 6,000 people, but still annually produced one quarter of a billion yards of material that sold for more than $60 million. The assets, and a sizable amount of cash on the balance sheet, caught the eye of Warren Buffett, an up-and-coming but then little-known investor from Omaha, Nebraska.

Buffett, who had founded Buffett Partnership Limited to make investments, started buying stock in Berkshire at $7.60 a share. He eventually paid an average of $14.86 a share, or a total of $14 million, and took control of the company on May 10, 1965.

By then, the company had declined to two mills and 2,300 employees. 
Buffett used Berkshire Hathaway as his investment vehicle, took the chairman's job in 1970 and acquired dozens of companies.

Berkshire Mill No. 1 was converted into 65 apartments in 1987 and is currently managed by Harvest Properties LLC.  In 2014 a $40 million development to turn Berkshire Mill No. 4 into 150 affordable apartments was proposed. Development has not started and the building is currently vacant.

References

Textile companies of the United States
American companies established in 1889
Manufacturing companies established in 1889
1889 establishments in Massachusetts
Berkshire Hathaway
Defunct textile companies
History of the textile industry in the United States
Adams, Massachusetts
Defunct manufacturing companies based in Massachusetts